Plouay is a commune in the Morbihan department in Brittany in north-western France. 

Plouay hosts the GP Ouest-France and the GP de Plouay, annual cycling races (a men's and women's race, respectively). It was also the location of the UCI Road World Championships in 2000. The Tour de France has visited this town three times: in 1998, 2002 and in 2006.

Population
Inhabitants of Plouay or Ploue are called Plouaysiens in French and Plouead (Ploueiz), Ploueadez (-ed) in Breton.

Geography

Historically, it belongs to Vannetais. The river Scorff forms the commune's western border. The area is hilly and forest-covered. Apart from the village centre, there are many hamlets in the commune.

Map

List of places

History

The oldest surviving parish registers date back to 1576. The marquis of Pontcallec had in the seventeenth  century in the village of Plouay court, prison, pillory and gallows with four pillars.

Breton language
The municipality launched a linguistic plan through Ya d'ar brezhoneg on 10 February 2006.

In 2008, 11.56% of the children in Plouay attended Breton-French bilingual classes in primary education.

Gallery

Twin towns
Plouay is twinned with Pershore in England.

See also
Communes of the Morbihan department

References

External links

 Cultural Heritage 
 Map showing location of Ploue in Breton
 Mayors of Morbihan Association 

Communes of Morbihan